Centaurium erythraea is a species of flowering plant in the gentian family known by the common names common centaury and European centaury.

Description
This is an erect biennial herb which reaches half a meter in height. It grows from a small basal rosette and bolts a leafy, erect stem which may branch. The triangular leaves are arranged oppositely on the stem and the erect inflorescences emerge from the stem and grow parallel to it, sometimes tangling with the foliage. Each inflorescence may contain many flowers. The petite flower is pinkish-lavender and about a centimeter across, flat-faced with yellow anthers. The fruit is a cylindrical capsule.

It flowers from June until September.

Distribution
This centaury is a widespread plant of Europe (including Scotland, Sweden and Mediterranean countries) and parts of western Asia and northern Africa. It has also naturalised in parts of North America, New Zealand, and eastern Australia, where it is an introduced species.

Taxonomy
It is also commonly known as “feverfoullie”, “gentian” or “centaury”.

Uses
The European centaury is used as a medical herb in many parts of Europe. The herb, mainly prepared as tisane, is thought to possess medical properties beneficial for patients with gastric and liver diseases.

Chemical constituents
C. erythraea contains phenolic acids, including ferulic and sinapic acids, as well as sterols (as brassicasterol and stigmasterol), secoiridoid and the glycosides, swertiamarin and sweroside.

References

External links
Jepson Manual Treatment
Photo gallery

erythraea
Medicinal plants of Africa
Medicinal plants of Asia
Medicinal plants of Europe
Plants described in 1753
Taxa named by Carl Linnaeus